Dashli may refer to several places in Iran:
 Dashli, East Azerbaijan
 Dashli-ye Olya - in the Golestan Province
 Dashli-ye Sofla - in the Golestan Province
 Dashli Qaleh - in the North Khorasan Province

Other places
 Dashli, Afghanistan - place in the Jowzjan Province, Afghanistan
 Dashli ada - island with a mud volcano off the coast of Azerbaijan